Nathanael "Nate" Bargatze (born March 25, 1979) is an American comedian.

Early life 
Nathanael Bargatze was born in Nashville, Tennessee, on March 25, 1979, the son of Carole and Stephen Bargatze. His father is of Italian descent and is a former clown who became a motivational speaker and magician. Bargatze attended Donelson Christian Academy in Nashville, and Volunteer State Community College in Gallatin, Tennessee.

Career 
Bargatze began his stand-up comedy career at The Boston in New York City. He has appeared on Late Night with Conan O'Brien and The Tonight Show Starring Jimmy Fallon. He was part of Fallon's Clean Cut Comedy Tour in 2013, also winning New York's Comedy Festival and the Boston Comedy Festival that year. He wrote for the Spike TV Video Game Awards and has performed for American armed forces in Iraq and Kuwait. 

He was mentioned by comedians Marc Maron and Jim Gaffigan as one of the top up-and-coming comics.

Bargatze's first stand-up album, Yelled at by a Clown (2014), was on the Billboard Top Ten Comedy Charts for two weeks, peaking at No. 2. He released his second album, Full Time Magic, in coordination with his Comedy Central special in May 2015. In 2017, Bargatze had a half-hour special released on Netflix as part of The Standups.

In March 2019, Bargatze released an hour-long Netflix special titled The Tennessee Kid, shot outside Atlanta, Georgia. His next stand-up special, The Greatest Average American, was released by Netflix in March 2021. It was filmed outdoors at Universal Studios Hollywood and was nominated for the 2022 Grammy Award for Best Comedy Album.

Bargatze was featured in an article for The Atlantic in 2021 where he was called "The Nicest Man in Stand-Up."

In January 2023, Bargatze's stand-up special, Hello World, filmed at the Celebrity Theater in Phoenix, Arizona, was released on Amazon Prime Video.

In 2022, Bargatze voiced a personality core named Grady in the short Portal spinoff game Aperture Desk Job.

Personal life
Bargatze lives in Nashville, Tennessee. He married Laura Baines on October 13, 2006. They have a daughter, Harper (July 8, 2012).

References

External links
 
 
 

1979 births
Living people
American male comedians
American stand-up comedians
21st-century American comedians
People from Old Hickory, Tennessee
Comedians from Tennessee